Bridgeport is an unincorporated community in Warren County, in the U.S. state of Missouri.

History
The first settlement at Bridgeport was made before 1810. The Bridgeport post office closed in 1893.

References

Unincorporated communities in Warren County, Missouri
Unincorporated communities in Missouri